The 2007 Paris–Tours is the 101st edition of this single day road bicycle racing event and is organized by the Amaury Sport Organisation (ASO), which also runs the Tour de France. The 256 km event took place on October 14, 2007 and was won by Alessandro Petacchi, the Italian rider for Team Milram in 5 hours, 32 minutes 37 seconds at an average speed of 46.179 km/h (28.694 mph).

General standings

2007-10-14: Paris–Tours, 256 km

External links
Race website

2007 UCI ProTour
2007 in French sport
October 2007 sports events in France
2007